, tentatively called HTV-X, is an uncrewed expendable cargo spacecraft under development by Japan Aerospace Exploration Agency (JAXA) as the successor of H-II Transfer Vehicle (HTV).  the first flight is planned to be launched in January 2024 to resupply International Space Station.

Development
In May 2015, Japan's Ministry of Education, Culture, Sports, Science and Technology announced a proposal to replace the HTV with an improved, cost-reduced version preliminarily called HTV-X.

The proposal of HTV-X  is as follows:
 To re-use the design of HTV's Pressurised Logistics Carrier (PLC) as much as possible, except for adding a side hatch for late cargo access after the spacecraft-launch vehicle integration.
 To replace the Unpressurised Logistics Carrier (ULC), Avionics Module, and Propulsion Module with a new Service Module.
 To load the unpressurised cargo on top of the Service Module rather than inside the spacecraft.

Re-using the PLC design will allow minimizing the development cost and risk. Concentrating the reaction control system (RCS) and the solar panels on the Service Module will simplify the wiring and piping, to reduce the weight and manufacturing cost. Loading the unpressurised cargo outside the spacecraft allows larger cargo, only limited by the launch vehicle fairing. The aim is to cut the cost in half, while keeping or extending the capability of the existing HTV.

By the simplification of the overall structure it was expected the launch mass of HTV-X to be dropped to 15,500 kg from HTV's 16,500 kg, while the maximum weight of cargo will be increased to 7,200 kg (net weight 5,850 kg excluding support structure weight) from HTV's 6,000 kg (net 4,000 kg).

In December 2015, the plan to develop HTV-X was approved by the Strategic Headquarters for Space Policy of the Cabinet Office, targeting launch in fiscal year 2021 for the flight of HTV-X1 (Technical Demonstration Vehicle) by the H3 Launch Vehicle. , new ISS plans from NASA's Flight Planning Integration Panel have set the launch of HTV-X1 for February 2022, which is on schedule.

With the Japan-US Open Platform Partnership Program (JP-US OP3) agreement in December 2015 to extend cooperation on ISS operations through 2024, Japan will provide its share of ISS operation costs with the form of transportation by HTV-X, and also be given an opportunity to develop a possible small return capsule.

In 2017 design, HTV-X consists of three modules: a lower, 3.5 m-long pressurised logistics module nearly identical to that of the HTV, elongated by 0.2 m and with a side access hatch added to allow late loading while mated to the rocket; a 2.7 m-long central Service Module capable of operating independently of the other modules, which contains two arrays of solar panels generating 1 kW of electrical power as opposed to the 200 W generated by the HTV, batteries capable of providing a peak output of 3 kW compared to the 2 kW of the original, and a 1 Mbit/s communication link in addition to the original 8 kbit/s link, though the main thrusters have been removed, so the HTV-X is purely reliant on Reaction Control System (RCS) motors mounted in a ring around the Service Module for propulsion, selected service module components have been mounted externally on the top for easy astronaut access. The last component is a 3.8 m long unpressurised cargo module, essentially a hollow cylinder with shelves that vastly expands the volume of unpressurised cargo.

The HTV-X has a length of 6.2 m, or 10 m with the unpressurised cargo module fitted. The payload fairing adaptor and payload dispenser have been widened from 1.7 m to 4.4 m to allow the pressurised cargo module to be swapped out for alternate modules, to add increased structural strength, and to accommodate the side hatch.

In 2021 final design, the side hatch of the pressurised module was abandoned, and the late cargo access is to use main hatch through the rocket's Payload Adapter Fitting (PAF).

Other payloads being considered to replace the unpressurised cargo module while carrying out ISS resupply missions are an external sensor package, a technology trial of an IDSS airlock with automated station docking as used by the Progress and ATV craft, a trial of rendezvous and docking with a simulated satellite module, a smaller satellite piggybacking the launch to reach ISS orbit, a station return capsule, assembling a beyond Earth orbit mission such as lunar lander from smaller modules and acting as a space tug shuttling orbiting unpressurised cargo modules to the ISS allowing stuff such as recyclable materials, excess propellant and spare parts to be stored in orbit for future use rather than discarded.

, an evolutionary version of HTV-X called HTV-XG is being considered for transferring cargo to the Lunar Gateway as part of the Artemis program.

Flights

, three flights are planned to resupply ISS.  This plan is before the announcement of delay of H3 Launch Vehicle development.

See also 

 Cargo spacecraft
 Comparison of space station cargo vehicles

References

External links 
 HTV-X, JAXA

 
Cargo spacecraft
Supply vehicles for the International Space Station
Space program of Japan